The Mount Whitney Trail is a hiking trail that climbs Mount Whitney, the tallest peak in the contiguous United States. It is a very popular trail during Summer and Fall when ice and snow are not present, and therefore its access is restricted by quotas from May to October. Access during non-peak months require permits from the United States National Forest, but quotas are not necessary.

History

The original pack trail from Lone Pine to the summit of Mount Whitney was designed by local engineer Gustave Marsh. This original trail, opened on July 22, 1904, was the basis for most of today's Mount Whitney Trail.

Route
The Mount Whitney Trail starts at Whitney Portal. The round-trip hike for healthy, fit individuals generally lasts about 12 to 14 hours.

The trail does not follow the most direct route used by mountaineers along the North Fork of Lone Pine Creek, but rather the easier grade along the main branch of Lone Pine Creek to its source. The trail then traverses very close to the ridgeline until reaching the summit plateau. This longer route allows for a standard hiking trail with a modest gradient. During peak season the trail is well-maintained and easy to follow. The trail loses a small amount of elevation beyond Trail Crest that is gained on the return. In this final stretch of the trail, on the west side of Whitney's needle-like south ridge, some sections of the trail must be rebuilt after each winter. The views of the interior High Sierra from the ridgeline are expansive, due to the elevation and precipitous exposure. The trail ends at the Smithsonian Institution Shelter on the summit of Mount Whitney.

Management
The Mount Whitney Trail, from above Lone Pine Lake to Trail Crest, lies within the special Mount Whitney Zone of the Inyo National Forest. Due to the high volume of trail users, the Forest Service enforces special regulations here to preserve Whitney's wild character. Wilderness permits are always required to use the trail, and between May 1 and November 1, a quota permits only 60 overnight users and 100 day users per day.

Beginning in 2012, the Mt. Whitney permit lottery switched over from mail-in applications to an online format.

Camping

It is sheltered by trees, near a waterfall and Bighorn Meadow. This is also the last place where there is a reliable water source. The lake at Trail Camp has algae from the human waste deposits and is usually purified before drinking. Depending on conditions, clean water may be found in springs on the switchbacks. Most overnight backpackers will take between 2 and 4 days to complete this trip.

Human waste

Human waste management was a major problem at Mount Whitney, and in 2006 the Inyo National Forest instituted a mandatory "pack it out" program. The Forest Service removed the solar latrines at Outpost Camp and Trail Camp, and instead began issuing "WAG Bags" (Waste Alleviation and Gelling) to trail users for human waste.

Bear canisters

From May 25 to October 31, backpackers are required to carry a bear-resistant canister; these can be rented at the Interagency Visitor Center south of Lone Pine or the Whitney Portal Store for a nominal fee. Black bears are common along the Mount Whitney Trail.  Night sightings of these bears are not unusual.  When traveling at night, hikers are advised to wield a bright headlight and a shrill whistle; making many strange, loud noises will alert the bears to human presence. If possible, hikers should travel in a larger group as bears are much less likely to approach a group than a single person.

Weather

The High Sierra, including Mount Whitney, has unpredictable weather patterns. Thunderstorms and lightning are a frequent occurrence at the peak on summer afternoons.

References

External links
Recreation.gov to apply for Mount Whitney Trail permits online.
Mt Whitney Hikers Association
Whitney Portal Store
The Mt. Whitney Day Hike & Backpacking Page

Hiking trails in California
Sierra Nevada (United States)
Protected areas of Inyo County, California
Inyo National Forest